Total Recall may refer to:

 Eidetic memory
 Hyperthymesia

Total Recall franchise
 Total Recall (1990 film), a film starring Arnold Schwarzenegger and Sharon Stone
 Total Recall, a 1989 novelization by Piers Anthony
 Total Recall (video game), a 1990 computer and NES game
 Total Recall (2012 film), a remake starring Colin Farrell and Kate Beckinsale
 Total Recall 2070, a 1999 Canadian television series inspired by the 1990 film

Television
 Total Recall (game show), an Australian game show
 "Total Recall" (Family Guy), an episode of Family Guy
 "Total Recall", an episode of Fanboy and Chum Chum

Music
 Total Recall (Luni Coleone album)
 Total Recall (Negative Approach album)
 "Total Recall", a song by The Sound
 "Total Recall" (Tom Robinson song), a 1980 song by Sector 27 on the album Sector 27

Literature
 Total Recall, a V. I. Warshawski detective novel by Sara Paretsky
 Total Recall: How the E-Memory Revolution Will Change Everything, a non-fiction book by Gordon Bell and Jim Gemmell
 Total Recall: My Unbelievably True Life Story, an autobiography by Arnold Schwarzenegger

See also
 Perfect recall (disambiguation) 
 Recall (disambiguation)